The Dillinger Escape Plan (DEP) was an American metalcore band from Morris Plains, New Jersey. Formed in early 1997, the group originally featured vocalist Dimitri Minakakis, lead guitarist Ben Weinman, rhythm guitarist Derek Brantley, bassist and keyboardist Adam Doll, and drummer and keyboardist Chris Pennie. The group remained active until December 2017, at which point the lineup featured Weinman (the band's only constant member), bassist Liam Wilson (who replaced Doll in 2000), vocalist Greg Puciato (who replaced Minakakis in 2001), drummer Billy Rymer (who joined in 2009) and rhythm guitarist Kevin Antreassian (who joined in 2015).

DEP evolved from an earlier hardcore punk group called Arcane in March 1997, and originally featured Minakakis, Weinman, Brantley, Doll and Pennie. Brantley left after just two shows, failing to turn up for the group's first recording sessions. The remaining members were forced to record the band's self-titled debut extended play (EP) for Now or Never Records as a four-piece. Shortly after the EP's release, Brantley's position was taken over by John Fulton, who performed on tour with the group later in the year. In 1998, the band released its second EP Under the Running Board, shortly after which Fulton left due to "creative differences". He was replaced by Jesuit guitarist Brian Benoit in time for the recording of the group's full-length debut album Calculating Infinity.

Just before the recording of Calculating Infinity started, Doll was involved in a road traffic accident in which he suffered a spinal fracture which paralyzed him from the chest down; he was forced to step back from the band, and Weinman performed bass on the album. After the album was finished, Doll was replaced by former M.O.D. bassist Jeff Wood, who was credited in the liner notes as "live bass machine". Wood toured with the group until autumn 2000, when he was replaced by Liam Wilson. In April 2001, it was announced that Minakakis had decided to leave DEP to pursue "non-music related endeavors". Before hiring a replacement, the group worked with former Faith No More and Mr. Bungle frontman Mike Patton on the EP Irony Is a Dead Scene, released the following year.

In October 2001, DEP announced that Greg Puciato was the band's new frontman, chosen from "over one hundred" singers who auditioned by submitting a recording of "43% Burnt". The new lineup's first release was Miss Machine, issued in 2004 as the follow-up to Calculating Infinity. Benoit underwent "major surgery" in December that year, and the next April suffered nerve damage in his left hand which rendered him unable to play guitar. He briefly tried to remain in the band on keyboards, but by May had left the band completely. James Love, formerly of Fenix TX, took his place on rhythm guitar at Benoit's own blessing. In 2006, the band released the digital-only EP Plagiarism, which featured "Unretrofied" in addition to four cover versions and a live recording of "The Perfect Design".

During a tour in August 2006, the band performed four shows without lead guitarist Ben Weinman for the first time, who it was announced had flown home to "deal with some personal issues". However, in subsequent interviews Weinman claimed that he had in fact briefly left the group due to various issues, including frustration with an arm injury he had suffered, as well as tensions with bandmates. During the four shows without Weinman, DEP drummer Chris Pennie was offered the role of drummer in Coheed and Cambria, however he was contractually obliged to remain with the group. After the shows, Jeff Tuttle replaced Love.

By June 2007, Pennie had officially left the band to join Coheed and Cambria, with drums on the upcoming album Ire Works recorded by Gil Sharone. The following month, Tuttle was officially unveiled as the band's new guitarist, although Weinman recorded all guitars on the album. The following year, rumors began to circulate that Sharone had left the band, although Weinman initially denied them. Early the next year, however, his departure was confirmed and Billy Rymer had taken his place. In 2010, the band released its fourth album Option Paralysis, which was the first to feature contributions from guitarist Tuttle.

In August 2012, at the end of the touring cycle for Option Paralysis, Tuttle announced that he was leaving the band to attend film school. By November, he had been replaced by returning member James Love, although he did not feature on 2013's One of Us Is the Killer as Weinman described him as "a live guy". Love remained until May 2015, when he was replaced by Kevin Antreassian. In 2016, the group released its sixth studio album Dissociation, shortly after which they announced that they would be disbanding after the album's touring cycle. The tour came to an end with three final shows in December 2017, at which former members Dimitri Minakakis, Brian Benoit and Adam Doll, plus Irony Is a Dead Scene vocalist Mike Patton, made special guest appearances.

Members

Latest

Former

Touring

Timeline

Lineups

References

External links
The Dillinger Escape Plan official website

Dillinger Escape Plan, The